In Old Kentucky is a 1919 American silent drama film produced by Louis B. Mayer and distributed through First National Attractions, later First National Pictures. The picture was directed by Marshall Neilan and starred Anita Stewart. It was based on the play In Old Kentucky  by Charles T. Dazey.

Neilan and Mayer worked often together at this time, but after Mayer became head of MGM in 1924, the two had a falling out which revealed each man disliking the other fiercely. Neilan was vocal about his dislike of Mayer, which damaged his Hollywood career.  Later, not finding work at the major studios, Neilan ended his career directing B movies.

Later, as head of MGM, Mayer had the film remade in 1927. In 1935, Will Rogers made a sound version at Fox.

MGM has preserved the film.

Cast
Anita Stewart as Madge Brierly
Mahlon Hamilton as Frank Layson
Edward Coxen as Joe Lorey
Charles Arling as Horace Holten
Edward Connelly as Col. Sandusky Doolittle
Adele Farrington as Aunt Aleathea
Marcia Manon as Barbara Holten
Frank Duffy as Eddie Lennhardt
John Currie as Uncle Neb

References

External links

1919 films
American silent feature films
American black-and-white films
American films based on plays
Films directed by Marshall Neilan
1919 drama films
Films produced by Louis B. Mayer
First National Pictures films
Silent American drama films
1910s American films